Boxing at the 2001 Southeast Asian Games was held in Paroi Centre Club Sports Centre, Negeri Sembilan, Malaysia from 9 to 16 September 2001

Medalist

Men's events

Medal table
Legend

References

External links
 

2001
2001 Southeast Asian Games events